Dorocordulia libera, the racket-tailed emerald, is a species of the dragonfly in the family Corduliidae found in North America.

References

External links

Dorocordulia libera, DiscoverLife
Dorocordulia libera, BugGuide
Dorocordulia libera, EoL
Racket-tailed emerald, NJodes
Racket-tailed emerald, Dragonfly Photographs

Corduliidae
Odonata of North America
Insects described in 1871
Taxa named by Edmond de Sélys Longchamps